Gil Servaes (born 11 April 1988, in Sint-Agatha-Berchem) is a retired Belgian association football player who last played for Racing Mechelen.

Career
He has played for Anderlecht. Formerly played on youth side for RFC Evere, Diegem Sport, KFC Strombeek, FC Brussels and Dender EH.

External links
Lastampa Calcio Profile
Footgoal.net

References

1988 births
Living people
People from Sint-Agatha-Berchem
Belgian footballers
Association football defenders
F.C.V. Dender E.H. players
R.S.C. Anderlecht players
Oud-Heverlee Leuven players
RWS Bruxelles players
K.R.C. Mechelen players

Belgian Pro League players
Challenger Pro League players
Footballers from Brussels